Diacrotricha is a genus of moths in the family Pterophoridae.

Species
Diacrotricha fasciola Zeller, 1852
Diacrotricha guttuligera Diakonoff, 1952
Diacrotricha lanceatus (Arenberger, 1986)

Pterophorini
Moth genera
Taxa named by Philipp Christoph Zeller